The 1954 World Table Tennis Championships women's singles was the 21st edition of the women's singles championship. Angelica Rozeanu defeated Yoshiko Tanaka in the final by three sets to one, to win a fifth consecutive title.

Results

See also
List of World Table Tennis Championships medalists

References

-
1954 in women's table tennis